Presidential elections were held for the first time in Mauritania on 20 August 1961 to elect the President for the next five years. Moktar Ould Daddah, who had been acting head of state since independence from France in 1960 was the only candidate, and was elected unopposed. Although he was a member of the ruling Mauritanian Regroupment Party, his candidacy was also supported by the Mauritanian National Union. Voter turnout was 93.6%.

The elections were the last multi party elections held in the country until 1992 as a constitutional amendment in 1964 declared the nation a one-party state, and during 1965 all parties merged with the ruling Mauritanian Assembly Party to form the Mauritanian People's Party.

Background
Mauritania came under the direct control of the French Colonial Empire during 1933. On 28 November 1958, a constitutional amendment allowed the creation of a transitional Legislative Council, replacing the Territorial Assembly established during the French colonial regime. The country lacked experts to frame the constitution and accepted the suggestions of a group of French jurists on 22 March 1959 unanimously.

After independence on 28 November 1960, the country declared itself the Islamic Republic of Mauritania, with Ould Daddah becoming the first President of the country. During the transitional period, Daddah was successful in orienting different tribal and ethnic divisions in the country. He faced pressure on some of the provinces annexed by the neighboring Morocco under Sultan Mohamed V and sought support from Arab neighbors. He also maintained relations with French government and sought the help to station its troops in Mauritania which would go on until 1966.

Results

References

External links

Mauritania
1961 in Mauritania
Presidential elections in Mauritania
Single-candidate elections
August 1961 events in Africa